Insane behavior, or insanity, is characterized by abnormal mental or behavioral patterns.

Insane may also refer to:

Music 
 Insane (album) or the title song, by Syron Vanes, 2003
 "Insane" (Korn song), 2016
 "Insane" (Texas song), 1998
 "Insane", a song by BtoB from Born to Beat, 2012
 "Insane", a song by Cold from Cold, 1998
 "Insane", a song by Eminem from Relapse, 2009
 "Insane", a song by Scars on Broadway from Scars on Broadway, 2008

Video games 
 Insane (2000 video game), an off-road racing game
 Insane (cancelled video game), a cancelled survival horror game

Other uses 
 Insane (film), a 2016 South Korean film
 Insane (Gröna Lund), a roller coaster at Gröna Lund amusement park in Stockholm
 INSANE (software), an animation engine developed at LucasArts

See also 
 Insanity (disambiguation)